San Polo Parco is a station of the Brescia Metro, in the city of Brescia in northern Italy.

This station is located on the border between the populous district of San Polo and the agricultural area to the north. It can only be reached on foot or by bike and caters primarily to the residential neighbourhood.

References

External links 

Brescia Metro stations
Railway stations opened in 2013
2013 establishments in Italy
Railway stations in Italy opened in the 21st century